Home for Summer is a South Korean television series starring Lee Young-eun, Yoon Sun-woo, Lee Chae-young, Kim Sa-kwon, Kim Hye-ok and Na Hye-mi. The series aired daily on KBS1 from 20:25 to 21:00 (KST) from April 29, 2019, to October 25, 2019.

Synopsis
A heartwarming story about family members who cannot hate each other even when they want to.

Cast

Main
 Lee Young-eun as Wang Geum-hee
 Yoon Sun-woo as Joo Sang-won
 Lee Chae-young as Joo Sang-mi
 Kim Sa-kwon as Han Joon-ho
 Kim Hye-ok as Na Yeong-sim
 Na Hye-mi as Wang Geum-joo

Supporting

Na Yeong-sim's family
 Lee Han-wi as Wang Jae-gook
 Seo Byuk-joon as Wang Geum-dong

Joo Yong-jin's family
 Kang Seok-woo as Joo Yong-jin
 Moon Hee-kyung as Heo Kyeong-ae
 Im Chae-won as Joo Yong-soon
 Son Jong-bum as Park Soo-cheol

Han Joon-ho's family
 Kim Ye-ryeong as Byeon Myeong-ja
 Kim San-ho as Han Seok-ho

YJ Plastic Surgery's doctors
 Byeon Joo-eun as Yoon Seon-kyeong
 Kim Ga-ran as Jeong So-ra

Others
 Kim Kiri as Oh Dae-seong
 Bae Woo-hee as Jin Soo-yeon
 Lee Jung-hyuk as Choi Seung-min	
 Kim Bum-jin as Lee Dong-wook
 Song Min-jae as Seo / Han Yeo-reum

Production
Early working title of the series is Queen's Children (Korean: 왕비의 자식들).

Viewership
In this table,  represent the lowest ratings and  represent the highest ratings.

Awards and nominations

Notes

References

External links
  
 

Korean Broadcasting System television dramas
2019 South Korean television series debuts
2019 South Korean television series endings
Korean-language television shows